Nicola Junior Belardo (born 14 September 1990) is an Italian rugby union player who plays as a Flanker. He currently plays for Rugby Calvisano in the Top12.

External links
Page at Italian rugby

1990 births
Italian rugby union players
Living people
Sportspeople from Naples
Zebre Parma players
Rugby union flankers